Bosnian Australians are Australians of Bosnian ancestry. At the 2021 census, 28,246 people stated that they had Bosnian ancestry (whether alone or in combination with another ancestry). At the 2021 census, 26,171 Australian residents were born in Bosnia and Herzegovina.

History 
There have been three major influxes of Bosnians to Australia. The first period occurred in the aftermath of World War II, and the second occurred in the late 1960s/early 1970s following an economic depression and open border policy in the former Yugoslavia. Bosnian immigrants who arrived in Australia in the 1960s made important contributions to modern-day Australia through their role in the construction of the Snowy Mountains Scheme in New South Wales.

The most recent wave of migration was during the 1990s when many Bosnians sought refuge from the Bosnian War. This migration was assisted under the refugee scheme of the Australian Red Cross. By 1996, a year after the war had ended, almost 14,000 migrants from Bosnia and Herzegovina were living in Australia. Most of the new arrivals settled in Victoria – Bosnia and Herzegovina was the fifth-largest source of immigrants to Victoria in 1995-96.

Demographics   
Bosnians have predominantly arrived in Australia after 1992, with most of the community living in the south-east of Melbourne and in the south-west of Sydney. There are Bosnian run mosques in Deer Park, Noble Park, Penshurst and Smithfield.

Media

The SBS broadcasts a Bosnian-language program on SBS Radio 2 from 3 PM to 4 PM every Sunday. It also broadcasts BHT 1's Dnevnik news program every Friday morning from 8 AM to 8:30 AM as part of its WorldWatch programming block.

Other community radio stations such as 3ZZZ (Melbourne), 4EB (Brisbane), 6EBA-FM (Perth), 2000FM (Sydney), VOX FM (Wollongong), 1CMS (Canberra), 5EBI (Adelaide) also broadcast in Bosnian.

Language 
In Sydney there are 5 Saturday schools for Bosnian Australian youths.
 
Bosnian Ethnic School Inc located at Amity College – Auburn
  
Bosnian Ethnic School Inc located at Australian Bosnian & Herzegovinian Cultural Association – Leppington 

Bosnian Ethnic School Inc located at Liverpool Public School – Liverpool  
 
Bosnian Ethnic School Inc located at Australian Bosnian Islamic Society Gazi Husrev-beg – Penshurst 
 
Bosnian Ethnic School Inc located at Australian Bosnian Islamic Society Gazi Husrev-beg – Smithfield

Sport clubs
FC Bossy Liverpool
FC Gazy Auburn

Notable people 
 Amir Alagic, soccer coach
 Almir Pandzo, handball player
 Ajdin Hrustic, soccer player
 Azra Hadzic, tennis player
 Andreja Pejic, model
 Bernard Tomic, tennis player
 Ed Husic, politician, Member for Chifley
 Reshad Strik, actor
 Husein Alicajic, filmmaker 
 Harley Balic, former AFL footballer 
Hana Basic, sprinter
 Katarina Carroll, Commissioner of the Queensland Police Service
 Dino Djulbic, soccer player 
 Dijana Alic, academic
 Inga Peulich, politician
 Ned Catic, former professional rugby league footballer
 Omar Jasika, tennis player
 Mirza Muratovic, soccer player
 Monika Radulovic, model
 Esma Voloder, model 
 Sasa Sestic, barista 
 Selma Kajan, middle-distance runner

See also

 Bosnian diaspora
 European Australians
 Europeans in Oceania
 Immigration to Australia

Notes

External links
 SBS Bosnian

Bosnia and Herzegovina diaspora
 
Bosniak diaspora
European Australian
Immigration to Australia